Communications Zone is a US Army and NATO term which describes a part of the theater of war operations.

The Communications Zone is the rear part of theater of operations (behind but contiguous to the combat zone) which contains the lines of communications, establishments for supply and evacuation, and other agencies required for the immediate support and maintenance of the field forces.

Communications Zones
WWII Communications Zone, European Theater of Operations.  This began in  May 1942 as part of the U. S. Army Services of Supply.  SOS commander Lt. Gen. Brehon B. Somervell recommended Maj. Gen. John C. H. Lee, then commanding the 2nd Infantry Division (United States) in Texas to Army Chief of Staff Gen. George C. Marshall who gave the assignment to Lee; Somervell had served under Lee in the 89th Infantry Division (United States) in WWI.  Lee spent two weeks in Washington selecting key staff and planning the Operation Bolero buildup of men and materiel in Britain.  This work continued through the invasions of North Africa, Sicily, and Italy, and on 6 June 1944 the SOS-ETO was abolished, becoming the Communications Zone, ETO.  Lee commanded the largest single unit in WWII; over 900,000 men and women by V-E Day, 8 May 1945, delivering over 41 million tons of arms and supplies to the continent.
Korean Communications Zone (KCOMZ)

References

Further reading
Logistics Matters and the U.S. Army in Occupied Germany, 1945-1949, By Lee Kruger, Springer Publishing, 2017

Military terminology